Big Men is a 2014 documentary film produced and directed by Rachel Boynton. It examines the oil industry, the development of a new oil field in West Africa, the accusations of corruption that follow, and the resource curse. The film follows Texas-based Kosmos Energy as it attempts to start oil production in the new Jubilee Field off the coast of Ghana. With huge amounts of money at stake, Kosmos juggles its partners in Ghana, financial backers in New York, and the Great Recession that dramatically reduces oil prices. The film also visits Nigeria's oil-rich Niger Delta, where decades of corruption and lack of development fuel militants, who attempt to gain a share of the oil pie. The film was released on March 14, 2014, to critical acclaim.

Production
The crew filmed between 2007 and 2011, in Ghana and Nigeria.

Reception
Big Men was acclaimed by critics. It holds a 90/100 on Metacritic and a 100% rating on Rotten Tomatoes. In The New York Times, Jeannette Catsoulis wrote that "this cool and incisive snapshot of global capitalism at work is as remarkable for its access as for its refusal to judge." Alan Scherstuhl of The Village Voice opined that the film "is no simple screed against tick-like profiteers growing fat on malnourished hosts," but instead "a richly detailed portrait".
In The Washington Post, Stephanie Merry argued, "Boynton’s most impressive feat in 'Big Men' is how she takes an impossibly convoluted scenario, makes sense of it and tells a story that's riveting on its own but also serves as a parable about greed and human nature."

References

External links
 

2014 films
2014 documentary films
Films shot in Ghana
Films shot in Nigeria
Documentary films about petroleum
Documentary films about Africa
Documentary films about crime
American documentary films
British documentary films
Danish documentary films
2010s English-language films
2010s American films
2010s British films